Pike Road Schools is a school district headquartered in unincorporated Montgomery County, Alabama. It serves the community of Pike Road.

History
Montgomery Public Schools gave approval to the separation of the Pike Road district in 2013.

The Pike Road district began educational operations in 2015, with a K-8 school. It was to add one year per grade level. As a result, the overall student body in the Montgomery district had a higher percentage of African Americans as non-African Americans had left the district.

In 2017 the Montgomery district agreed to sell Georgia Washington Middle School to the Pike Road district. The building was sold so the Pike Road district could quickly acquire space to build a senior high. In 2018 the contract of sale was signed. It became Pike Road High School.

References

External links
 Pike Road Schools
School districts in Alabama
Education in Montgomery County, Alabama
2015 establishments in Alabama
Educational institutions established in 2015